The Cessna T303 Crusader is an American six-place light twin-engined aircraft built by Cessna Aircraft Company. Production ceased in 1986.

Design and development
The original Cessna 303 Clipper was first flown on February 14, 1978; it was a low-wing four-seat Lycoming-powered twin-engined aircraft that would have competed with the Piper Seminole, Gulfstream American GA-7 Cougar, and Beechcraft Duchess. After market demand for four-place light twins declined, only one 303 Clipper was built before Cessna redesigned the aircraft as a six-seat twin. They also renamed the aircraft out of legal concern, since Pan Am Airlines held the trademark on the name "Clipper" in reference to their fleet aircraft.

The new model, designated the T303 Crusader first flew on October 17, 1979, with the first deliveries being made in October, 1981. The T303 is an all-metal low-wing six-seat twin-engined aircraft with a retractable tricycle undercarriage. At the time, it was the first all-new production twin built by Cessna in over a decade. With a declining market, only 297 were built.

Examples were exported to Europe, with several still operating in the United Kingdom in 2012 and two flying in Goondiwindi, Queensland, Australia. Many are still flying in Colombia in air taxi and private operations.

Operators

Military operators
Haiti Air Corps
 Armed Forces of Guatemala

Specifications (T303)

See also

References
Notes

Bibliography
 Taylor, John W.R. Jane's All The World's Aircraft 1982–83. London:Jane's Yearbooks, 1982. .

External links

303
1970s United States civil utility aircraft
Low-wing aircraft
Cruciform tail aircraft
Aircraft first flown in 1978
Twin piston-engined tractor aircraft